Masbrough is a suburb of Rotherham, South Yorkshire, England. It was named as the west of Rotherham by the middle of the Industrial Revolution, namely that part on the left bank of Don. Historically part of the West Riding of Yorkshire, it is in the Metropolitan Borough of Rotherham, centred 0.5 miles (0.8 km) west of Rotherham town centre. Much of the suburb falls within the Rotherham West ward of Rotherham MBC.

History and landmarks

Part of its land in the north lay within the manor of Kimberworth, the other contiguous western suburb of Rotherham today – Masbrough did not feature in the Domesday Book survey of 1086.

A commemorative memorial to 50 victims of a boat disaster at Masbrough in 1841 by Edwin Smith of Sheffield is in All Saints Church, Rotherham.

Legacies
A large memorial to a celebrated iron magnate, Samuel Walker, stands behind the site once occupied by the 1760 Independent chapel (with a date stone of 1777), the Walker Mausoleum. After being closed as a place of worship, the chapel became a carpet showroom Allens of Rotherham, but was destroyed by fire in 2012. It is connected by a short foot subway and Chapel Walk to all the historic buildings in central Rotherham. There were further memorials and statues within the chapel building. The chapel's statue to Jonathan Walker (died 1807), who was at the heart of the iron industry that led to the local area's development, depicts the man leaning on a truncated column "with head in hand". 
 
In 1862, the Midland Iron Company was the scene of an industrial disaster, when one of the boilers exploded, killing nine people. No trace of this company exists as it became the site of a new bus depot in 1982.

Schools
The Masbrough community is served by Thornhill and Ferham primary schools. Secondary schooling is provided by Winterhill School in nearby Kimberworth.

Places of worship
Masbrough has six places of worship: St Bede's Roman Catholic Church, St Paul's Church of England Church, and Rotherham Assemblies of God, now known as Liberty Church, Rotherham, and the Jamia Mosque in College Road and two other mosques for Sunni Muslims.

Demography

The electoral ward largely co-extensive with Masbrough has lately been named Rotherham West. Respondents in this ward to the 2011 Census mainly identified themselves ethnically as White British, White European or British Pakistani.

People in this ward born in non-UK EU countries numbered approximately 5 per cent of the population: 572 (of which Ireland 35). Residents born in South Asia numbered 591, the Middle East 77, Zimbabwe 69, and Central and Western Africa 60. The dense minorities communities in the ward are due to the affordability of local housing.

Sport

Transport
Rotherham Masborough railway station closed, having been opened in 1840 by the North Midland Railway as an interchange with the Sheffield and Rotherham Railway. Its services were diverted in 1987 to a new Rotherham Central railway station on a parallel line 600 m to the east.

The M1 motorway passes, at junction 34, Meadowhall, the far western neighbourhood of Masbrough, which is associated with Kimberworth.

Notable people
Josiah Beckwith (1734 – before May 1800), antiquary, settled in Masbrough.
Ebenezer Elliott (1781–1849), the "Corn Law Rhymer", was born in Masbrough. Though a mill owner, he agitated against the Corn Laws for the hardship they caused the poor.
Sandy Powell (1900–1982), radio comedian ("Can you hear me, Mother?"), attended White's School in Masbrough.
Ryan Sampson (born 1985), television actor (Plebs, After You've Gone), was born in Masbrough.
Samuel Walker (1779–1851), ironmaster, lived at Masbrough Hall and owned an ironworks that flourished until the end of the Napoleonic Wars. He was MP for Aldeburgh from 1818 to 1820.
Edward Williams (1750–1813), a Welsh-born co-founder of the London Missionary Society, became the pastor of Masbrough Independent Chapel in 1794.

References

Geography of Rotherham